Arachnobas sectator is a species of the true weevil family. It occurs in Papua New Guinea

References 

 Catalogue of Life
 Wtaxa
 Weevil

Molytinae